Johan Limpers (2 August 1915, in Heemstede – 10 June 1944, in Overveen) was a Dutch sculptor.

Limpers was a student of Jan Bronner at the Rijksakademie. His work followed the ideas of Jan Bronner and was monumental, for this he won the Dutch equivalent of the Prix de Rome in 1940.

During the Second World War he was active in the resistance and took part in setting fire to the Amsterdam registration office in 1943. He was executed by a German firing squad at Overveen. After the war he was reburied at the Eerebegraafplaats Bloemendaal.

He was married with fellow member of the resistance and sculptor Katinka van Rood.

1915 births
1944 deaths
Dutch resistance members
Dutch sculptors
Dutch male sculptors
Prix de Rome (Netherlands) winners
People from Heemstede
Executed Dutch people
People executed by Nazi Germany by firing squad
Resistance members killed by Nazi Germany
Dutch people executed by Nazi Germany
20th-century sculptors